KBGG (1700 AM) is a commercial radio station in Des Moines, Iowa . The station is owned by Cumulus Media and it airs a sports radio format, known as "101.3 & 1700 The Champ".

KBGG's studios and offices are located in Urbandale.  The main AM transmitter is located off Fairview Lane in Pleasant Hill.  KBGG is in the "Expanded Band," one of only a handful of stations at AM 1700.  It is powered at 10,000 watts by day and 1,000 watts at night, using a non-directional antenna.

Programming and Personalities
Several sports talk shows are heard on 1700 The Champ KBGG weekdays: Taz & The Moose, The D.A. Show, Jim Rome, The Drive with Wolfgang and Steen, Tiki & Tierney, Bill Reiter and Amy Lawrence.

KBGG serves as the Des Moines affiliate for the Kansas City Chiefs and the University of Northern Iowa men's basketball and football. KBGG also carries the NFL on Westwood One Sports.

Other local and regional programming includes: 
 NCAA & Pro Sports Live Play x Play courtesy of Westwood One, Compass Media Networks & Learfield
 Chiefs Kingdom Show: 6:00 p.m. Tuesdays
 NFL Prime Time Live Play x Play
 Chiefs Radio Network
 UNI Panthers Football & Basketball Play x Play
 UNI Coach’s Show: Panther Sports Talk
 ISU Coach’s Pregame Show with Paul Clark
 The Hawkeye Huddle (Tuesday’s 6-7 p.m.) during Iowa Hawkeye Football and Basketball season

History
KBGG originated as the expanded band "twin" of an existing station on the standard AM band.

On March 17, 1997 the Federal Communications Commission (FCC) announced that eighty-eight stations had been given permission to move to newly available "Expanded Band" transmitting frequencies, ranging from 1610 to 1700 kHz, with KKSO in Des Moines, a station that dated to 1947, authorized to move from 1390 kHz to 1700 kHz.

A construction permit for the expanded band station was assigned the call letters KBGG on November 12, 1997. FCC's policy was that both the original station and its expanded band counterpart could operate simultaneously for up to five years, after which owners would have to turn in one of the two licenses, depending on whether they preferred the new assignment or elected to remain on the original frequency. It was ultimately decided to transfer full operations to the expanded band station, and on February 2, 2001 the license for KKSO on 1390 AM was cancelled.

The new dial position gave the station more daytime power and a non-directional signal. The call sign KBGG was shared with its FM sister station. The WSJZ call sign was briefly parked on the frequency from June 6 to June 18, 2002; the station then reverted to KBGG.

In the 2000s, KBGG broadcast a Spanish language Regional Mexican music format and was known as "La Indomable AM."

On February 25, 2008, the station relaunched as "1700 The Champ".

After having been an ESPN Radio affiliate for nearly five years, KBGG became an affiliate of CBS Sports Radio on January 2, 2013, as part of a Cumulus Media-wide switch.  Cumulus, which owns KBGG, has a financial stake in CBS Radio Sports.

In October 2015, the station became a talk/sports hybrid and branded itself 1700 KBGG The Big Talker.   Weekday mornings began with Good Day With Doug Stephan, featuring news director Dianna Kelly with local information, followed by The Dave Ramsey Show and Red Eye Radio heard overnight.

In 2017, Marty Tirrell of the "Marty and Miller"  show stopped making payments to Cumulus Media and the show ended on 1700.  Also in August 2017, "The Ken Miller Show" started the sports day from 12-2, followed by CBS Sports from 2-4.  "Jimmy B and TC" which originally was on from 12-2 moved from 4-6.

On October 15, 2018, the station returned to full time sports talk.

On December 7, 2021, KBGG began simulcasting on newly licensed FM translator K267CY (101.3 Mhz). The antenna is co-located on sister FM station KHKI's tower in Johnston.

References

External links
The Champ

BGG
Sports radio stations in the United States
Cumulus Media radio stations
Radio stations established in 1998
1998 establishments in Iowa
CBS Sports Radio stations